16th Ohio Battery was an artillery battery that served in the Union Army during the American Civil War.

Service
The 16th Ohio Battery was organized in Springfield, Ohio August 20, 1861, and mustered in September 5, 1861, for a three-year enlistment under Captain James A. Mitchell.  Despite its designation, it was actually the third battery raised in Ohio.

The battery was attached to 1st Division, District of Southeast Missouri, Department of the Missouri, to May 1862. Artillery, 1st Division, Army of Southwest Missouri, to July 1862. District of Eastern Arkansas, Department of the Missouri, to January 1863. Artillery, 12th Division, XIII Corps, Army of the Tennessee, to July 1863. Artillery, 3rd Division, XIII Corps, Department of the Tennessee, to August 1863, and Department of the Gulf to January 1864. Artillery, 1st Division, XIII Corps, Department of the Gulf, to June 1864. Defenses of New Orleans, Louisiana, Department of the Gulf, to August 1864. Artillery Reserve, Department of the Gulf, to August 1865.

The 16th Ohio Battery mustered out of service at Camp Chase in Columbus, Ohio, on August 2, 1865.

Detailed service
Ordered to St. Louis, Mo., September 5. Moved from St. Louis to Jefferson City, Mo., October 13, and duty there until February 14, 1862. Moved to St. Louis, Mo., then to Pilot Knob, Mo., March 6. March to Doniphan March 21–31, 1862. Action at Pitman's Ferry April 1. Moved to Pocahontas, Ark., April 5–11; then to Jacksonport May 3. To Batesville May 14, then marched to Augusta, Ark., June 20-July 4. Marched to Clarendon, then to Helena, Ark., July 5–14. Duty at Helena and at Old Town Landing until April 1863. Ordered to Milliken's Bend, La., April 8. Movement on Bruinsburg and turning Grand Gulf April 25–30. Battle of Port Gibson May 1. Fourteen-Mile Creek May 12–13. Battle of Champion Hill May 16. Siege of Vicksburg, Miss., May 18-July 4. Assaults on Vicksburg May 19 and 22. Advance on Jackson, Miss., July 5–10. Siege of Jackson July 10–17. Ordered to New Orleans, La., August 21, and duty there until September 20. Moved to Berwick Bay and duty there until December 27. Ordered to New Orleans, then to Texas January 1, 1864. Duty at Matagardo Peninsula, Indianola, Powder Horn, and Matagorda Island until June 1864. Ordered to New Orleans, La., and garrison duty there until July 13, 1865. Ordered home July 13, 1865.

Casualties
The battery lost a total of 47 men during service; 1 officer and 1 enlisted man killed or mortally wounded, 45 enlisted men died due to disease.

Commanders
 Captain James A. Mitchell

See also

 List of Ohio Civil War units
 Ohio in the Civil War

References
 Byrd, Wallace. 14 Months in the Union Artillery:  The Diary of Private Wallace Byrd, 16th Ohio Battery, September, 1861 to October, 1862 (Springfield, OH:  Larry Marple), 1998.
 Dyer, Frederick H.  A Compendium of the War of the Rebellion (Des Moines, IA:  Dyer Pub. Co.), 1908.
 History of the Sixteenth Battery of Ohio Volunteer Light Artillery, U.S.A.:  From Enlistment, August 20, 1861, to Muster Out, August 2, 1865 (S.l.:  s.n.), 1906. [reprinted 1990]
 Ohio Roster Commission. Official Roster of the Soldiers of the State of Ohio in the War on the Rebellion, 1861–1865, Compiled Under the Direction of the Roster Commission (Akron, OH: Werner Co.), 1886–1895.
 Reid, Whitelaw. Ohio in the War: Her Statesmen, Her Generals, and Soldiers (Cincinnati, OH: Moore, Wilstach, & Baldwin), 1868. 
Attribution

External links
 Ohio in the Civil War: 16th Ohio Battery by Larry Stevens
 National flag of the 16th Ohio Battery
 Guidon of the 16th Ohio Battery
 16th Ohio Battery monument at Vicksburg

Military units and formations established in 1861
Military units and formations disestablished in 1865
Units and formations of the Union Army from Ohio
Artillery units and formations of the American Civil War
1861 establishments in Ohio